Aditya Shrivastava (born 18 September 1993) is an Indian cricketer who plays for Madhya Pradesh. He made his List A debut on 20 February 2021, for Madhya Pradesh in the 2020–21 Vijay Hazare Trophy.

References

External links
 

1993 births
Living people
Indian cricketers
Madhya Pradesh cricketers
Cricketers from Bhopal